"You've Got Your Whole Life Ahead of You Baby" is a song recorded by English singer-songwriter duo Ider for their debut studio album, Emotional Education. It was released on 27 July 2018 as the second single from the album.

Background and composition
The origins of the song's title comes from a note Markwick wrote in her diary about a year before the song was recorded. Lyrically, the song deals with the anxieties of young adulthood. Speaking about the track, Markwick said: "It was inspired by conversations we’ve had and feelings shared amongst our friends. It’s about the irony of wishing you could act in the moment through hindsight – living life the way you think your future self would want you to."

Music video
The music video for "You've Got Your Whole Life Ahead of You Baby" was released on 13 September 2018. The video features Markwick and Somerville in a garden during the summertime. It was directed by Ider themselves.

Live performances
Ider performed "You've Got Your Whole Life Ahead of You Baby" at Green Man Festival in September 2018.

Track listing
Digital download
 You've Got Your Whole Life Ahead of You Baby – 3:45

Credits and personnel
 Megan Markwick – lead vocals, synth
 Lily Somerville – backing vocals, keyboard
 Ben Scott – drums
 Rodaidh McDonald – production

References

2018 singles
2018 songs
Ider (band) songs